Romund Gabrielsen (22 July 1917 – 6 February 1971) was a British swimmer. He competed the men's 100 metre freestyle and men's 4 × 200 metre freestyle relay events at the 1936 Summer Olympics.

References

1917 births
1971 deaths
British male swimmers
British male freestyle swimmers
Olympic swimmers of Great Britain
Swimmers at the 1936 Summer Olympics
People from Romford
20th-century British people